Hornsdale Power Reserve is a 150 MW (194 MWh) grid-connected energy storage system owned by Neoen co-located with the Hornsdale Wind Farm in the Mid North region of South Australia, also owned by Neoen.

The original installation in 2017 was the largest lithium-ion battery in the world at 129 MWh and 100 MW. 
It was expanded in 2020 to 194 MWh at 150 MW.
Despite the expansion, it lost that title in August 2020 to the Gateway Energy Storage in California, USA. The larger Victorian Big Battery began operations in December 2021.

During 2017 Tesla, Inc. won the contract and built the Hornsdale Power Reserve, for a capital cost of A$90 million, leading to the colloquial Tesla big battery name.

In November 2019, Neoen confirmed that it was increasing capacity by a further 50MW/64.5MWh to a combined 193.5 MWh. The increased storage capacity was installed by March 23, 2020, and the increased power became operational in early September 2020.

Construction
South Australia received 90 proposals and considered 5 projects to build a grid-connected battery to increase grid stability under adverse weather events. This will enable less use of gas-fired generators to provide grid stability.

Elon Musk placed a wager that the battery would be completed within "100 days from contract signature", otherwise the battery would be free. Tesla had already begun construction, and some units were already operational by 29 September 2017, the time the grid contract was signed. The battery construction was completed and testing began on 25 November 2017. It was connected to the grid on 1 December 2017.  The  days between grid contract and completion easily beat Musk's wager of "100 days from contract signature", which started when a grid connection agreement was signed with ElectraNet on 29 September 2017,  days after Musk's offer on 10 March (in Australia). Samsung 21700-size cells are used.

Expansion
In November 2019, Neoen announced that it would increase the battery capacity by 50%.

The expansion was completed by Aurecon on 2 September 2020, increasing its impact in the South Australia grid. The battery receives $4 million per year for essential grid security services.

Operation
It is owned and operated by Neoen, with the state government having the right to call on the stored power under certain circumstances.
 70 MW running for 10 minutes (11.7 MWh) is contracted to the government to provide stability to the grid (grid services) and prevent load-shedding blackouts while other  generators are started in the event of sudden drops in wind or other network issues. This service reduced the cost of grid services to the Australian Energy Market Operator by 90% in its first 4 months.
 30 MW for 3 hours (90 MWh) is used by Neoen for load management to store energy when prices are low and sell it when demand is high.

On 14 December 2017, at 1:58:59 am, the HPR reacted when unit A3 at Loy Yang Power Station tripped.  As its generators spun down over the next 30 seconds, the loss of its 560 MW of base power caused a dip in the system frequency.  By 1:59:19, the frequency had fallen to 49.8 Hz, and triggered HPR's response, injecting 7.3 MW into the grid and effectively helping to stabilise the system before the Gladstone Power Station was able to respond at 1:59:27. This synchronverter reaction is a built-in feature, but had not previously been effectively demonstrated.

On 25 May 2021, HPR has reported a successful real-life test of its new “virtual machine mode” by demonstrating an inertial response from a small selection of trial inverters, following the grid disturbances created by events in Queensland.

Revenues from operation 
During two days in January 2018 when the wholesale spot price for electricity in South Australia rose due to hot weather, the battery made its owners an estimated  as they sold power from the battery to the grid for a price of around /MWh. (This is a third-party estimate, based on spot energy prices; it is possible that the HPR has contracted to provide power at a lower price, in exchange for a more certain income stream.)

After six months of operation, the Hornsdale Power Reserve was responsible for 55% of frequency control and ancillary services in South Australia. The battery usually arbitrages 30 MW or less, but in May 2019 began charging and discharging at around 80 MW and for longer than usual, increasing wind power production by reducing curtailment. FCAS is the main source of revenue. When the Heywood interconnector failed for 18 days in January 2020, HPR provided grid support while limiting power prices. This event was the main contributor to Neoen's €30 million ($A46.3 million) operating profit from Australian battery storage in 2020.

Benefits for the consumers 
By the end of 2018, it was estimated that the Power Reserve had saved  in costs, mostly in eliminating the need for a fuel-powered 35 MW Frequency Control Ancillary Service. In 2019, grid costs were reduced by $116 million due to the operation of HPR. 
Almost all of the savings delivered by the Hornsdale battery came from its role in frequency and ancillary control markets, where HPR put downward pressure on total prices.

Controversy 
On September 23, 2021, the Australian government sued Neoen SA, saying the French firm's Tesla "Big Battery" in South Australia did not provide backup power during four months in 2019 for which it had received payment.

See also
Battery storage power station

References

External links 
 Hornsdale Power Reserve Upgrade
 energypost.eu – Tesla big battery defies sceptics, sends industry bananas over performance
 Today's generation. Today's charging.

Energy storage projects
Electric power infrastructure in South Australia
Mid North (South Australia)